Clivina impressefrons is a species of ground beetle in the subfamily Scaritinae. It was described by John Lawrence LeConte in 1844.

References

impressefrons
Beetles described in 1844